Lapa dos Brejões is a complex of caverns formed in Neoproterozoic limestones of the Una Group of caves (Salitre formation) along the Jacaré river, northeast side of the Irecê sedimentary basin. According to local people, the Lapa dos Brejões was discovered in 1877, but the first discoveries inside the cave were published only in 1938 by Father Camilo Torrendt.

Geology
A collapsed portion called karst canyon divides the cave into two segments, Brejões I and Brejões II, which together sum . Along the canyon one find shelter under the rocks and cave paintings of some sites.

Their features are cylindrical with their base wider than the top that reach  in diameter, occupied by large piles of blocks of rock and huge pillars anchored to the walls.

Brejões II (BA-083) is  meters long and presents several galleries. The Jacaré river, which went through a hole 300 meters before the main entrance, re-appears inside the cave after the initial , and again inside Lapa dos Brejões II, until it finally comes up  outside the main entrance to the cave. The Racekiela cavernicula (Porifera:Demospongiae), of the genus Racekiela, is now a new species of cave freshwater sponge first recorded in Brazil.

See also
List of caves in Brazil

References

External links
 Base de Dados do Ministerio do Meio Hambiente Governo Federal - ICMBIO Official Website

Caves of Bahia
Wild caves